Rabbi Dovid Lifshitz (1906–1993) was a distinguished Rosh yeshiva in the Rabbi Isaac Elchanan Theological Seminary (RIETS) for almost fifty years. He was appointed upon the invitation of Rabbi Samuel Belkin in 1944. He was also known as the "Suvalker Rav", due to his previous position as the Rabbi of the European town of Suvalk, which he maintained until its capture by the Nazis in 1940. Some of his lectures on the Talmud were later compiled and published as "Shiurei Rav Dovid Lifshitz".

Early years
Rabbi Lifshitz was born in Minsk, then Imperial Russia in 1906 to Yaakov Aryeh and Ittel Lifshitz. His paternal grandfather, Rav Shlomo Zalman Lifshitz, was a businessman in Grodno as well as a distinguished Talmudic scholar, who authored the Olas Shlomo. He attended cheder together with Avraham Rosenstein, where they learned Hebrew and Hebrew grammar from Avraham's father, who was the teacher.  In 1919, his family moved to Grodno, where he was a foremost student of the famed Rabbi Shimon Shkop in the Grodno Yeshiva (Shaar Hatorah). He later studied in the Mir yeshiva, staying until 1932, receiving Semicha and becoming well known as an outstanding scholar. In 1933, he married Tzipporah Chava Yoselowitz, the daughter of the renowned rabbi of Suvalk, Rabbi Yosef Yoselowitz. Upon the death of his father-in-law in 1935, Rabbi Lifshitz became chief rabbi of the important city and its 27 congregations, where he developed a reputation as a warm and involved spiritual leader, concerned with all Jews. He remained in Suvalk until the Nazis captured the city in 1940.

Relocation to America
In 1941, Rabbi Lifshitz reached America along with his wife and daughter, and was appointed a rosh yeshiva of Beis Midrash LeTorah in Chicago. Rabbi Lifshitz was soon accorded immense stature among his fellow rabbis, his students and the rest of the Chicago community. His reputation as an outstanding rosh yeshiva spread throughout America and he received offers for several positions. He accepted the invitation of Rabbi Samuel Belkin and in 1944, was appointed rosh yeshiva of RIETS in New York City. There he taught Torah for almost 50 years to thousands of students, many of whom came to be distinctively known as "Reb Dovid's students". His efforts on behalf of the community were numerous. He served as a member of the presidium of the Agudas HaRabbonim of America and Canada for many years.

His discourses in Jewish concepts such as Chochma and Mussar were compiled and published by his students and given the title "Tehillah LeDovid". His lectures on the Talmud were also published as "Shiurei Rav Dovid Lifshitz".

Ezras Torah

Lifshitz served as president of Ezras Torah, an international relief fund, during the final 17 years of his life.

Family
A daughter was murdered as an infant in 1941. Lifshitz is survived by his wife, three daughters, "16 grandchildren, and numerous great-grandchildren."

Publications
Shiurei Rav Dovid Lifshitz - Chulin, 5753
Tehillah LeDovid, 5754
Shiurei Rav Dovid Lifshitz - Gittin, Kiddushin, Makkos, 5755

References

External links
YU Torah Online Biography
Rabbi Lifshitz: An Intimate Portrait 
Recollections and photos from Rabbi Lifshitz's daughter Chaya Waxman

1906 births
1993 deaths
American Haredi rabbis
Yeshiva University rosh yeshivas
Hebrew Theological College rosh yeshivas
Mir Yeshiva alumni